Michel Tsiba (born 21 December 1997) is a Dutch pair skater. With his skating partner, Daria Danilova, he is the 2020 Dutch national champion and the 2020 NRW Trophy bronze medalist. They competed in the final segment at the 2020 European Championships and are the first Dutch pair to qualify for the World Championships.

Personal life 
Tsiba was born on 21 December 1997 in Groningen to a Russian father and a Ukrainian mother. He has an older sister. Tsiba is fluent in Russian.

Career

Early career 
Tsiba started competing at the age of seven. He originally wanted to compete in ice hockey, but was advised to learn to skate in the figure skating club first. As a child, Tsiba experienced bullying from his peers about being a figure skater, who referred to him as "a ballerina in a tutu" and often called him "gay" or other homophobic remarks. Due to the relative obscurity of figure skating in the Netherlands, he admitted to being jealous of popular speed skaters like Sven Kramer when he was young.

As a singles skater, Tsiba was coached by Viola Striegler and Susan Mason and is the 2014 Dutch junior national and 2018 Dutch national champion. He switched disciplines from men's singles to pair skating because he felt that he was too tall to succeed in learning quadruple jumps. Tsiba had a tryout in summer 2017 that ultimately did not work out. He officially retired from singles skating after winning his first senior national title in 2018.

Tsiba teamed up with Russian skater Daria Danilova for the Netherlands in May 2018. Earlier in the season, he had met one of her coaches at a seminar in Berlin and they arranged a tryout. At the start of their partnership, Danilova/Tsiba alternated training in Berlin and Moscow every three months due to the differences in their respective citizenships' visa requirements. The pair fund over half of their training costs out of pocket via Tsiba's student finances.

2018–2019 season 
Danilova/Tsiba won their debut international competition, the 2018 Golden Spin of Zagreb on the junior level. They then placed tenth at the 2019 Bavarian Open. In February, Danilova/Tsiba won the 2019 Dutch junior national title unopposed. However, they missed achieving the minimum TES requirements for the 2019 World Junior Championships.

2019–2020 season 
Danilova/Tsiba competed at three Challenger Series events to open the season, finishing tenth at 2019 CS Finlandia Trophy, 17th at 2019 CS Warsaw Cup, and 15th at 2019 CS Golden Spin of Zagreb.

At the 2020 European Championships in January, Danilova/Tsiba became the first Dutch pair in 24 years to compete at a European Championships since Jeltje Schulten / Alcuin Schulten last represented the country at the event in 1996. They qualified to the final segment and finished 16th overall. In February, they finished eighth at the Bavarian Open and tenth at the Challenge Cup; the latter event doubled as the Dutch Championships where, as the only Dutch pair, Danilova/Tsiba won their first senior national title.

At the Challenge Cup, Danilova/Tsiba earned the necessary TES minimums for the 2020 World Championships. They are the first Dutch pair in history to qualify for the World Championships. The event was eventually cancelled due to the COVID-19 pandemic.

2020–2021 season 
During the offseason, Tsiba underwent surgery to repair a torn meniscus. However, the pair did not start training together again until the end of August due to issues with Danilova's Dutch visa. Danilova/Tsiba made their season debut at the 2020 NRW Autumn Trophy in November and won their first senior international medal, bronze behind Germans Annika Hocke / Robert Kunkel and Minerva Fabienne Hase / Nolan Seegert. Making their debut at the World Championships in Stockholm, they placed twenty-second.

2021–2022 season 
Beginning the season at the 2021 Lombardia Trophy, Danilova/Tsiba placed eighth. They competed at the 2021 CS Nebelhorn Trophy, placing ninth and failing to qualify a place at the 2022 Winter Olympics. Their third Challenger event, the 2021 CS Warsaw Cup, Danilova/Tsiba were fifteenth. They finished twenty-first at the 2022 European Championships, missing the free skate.

Danilova/Tsiba concluded the season at the 2022 World Championships, where they finished a career-best ninth in a field depleted due to Russia being banned as a result of their invasion of Ukraine and the Chinese Skating Association opted not to send athletes to compete in Montpellier.

2022–2023 season 
Danilova/Tsiba decided that the Russian invasion of Ukraine would not affect their training in Russia, opting to spend about half their time in Sochi, Russia, and half in Heerenveen, Netherlands. On training in Russia, they commented: "We don't notice the war here. It's shockingly quiet." They were unable to compete at the 2022 Skate America because Danilova's visa application was declined.

Danilova/Tsiba began their season with a sixth-place finish at the 2022 CS Finlandia Trophy. They finished sixth as well at the 2022 NHK Trophy, their Grand Prix debut, and then fifth at the 2022 Grand Prix of Espoo. Nika Osipova / Dmitry Epstein won the Netherlands' only pair skating berth at the 2023 European Championships.

Programs

With Danilova

Men's singles

Competitive highlights 
GP: Grand Prix; CS: Challenger Series; JGP: Junior Grand Prix

Pairs with Danilova

Men's singles

References

External links 
 
 
 Official website

1997 births
Living people
Dutch male pair skaters
Dutch male single skaters
Dutch people of Russian descent
Dutch people of Ukrainian descent
Competitors at the 2017 Winter Universiade
21st-century Dutch women